Two ships of the United States Navy have borne the name USS Perch, named in honor of the perch, a type of fresh-water spiny-finned fish belonging to the family Percidae.

 The first  was a Porpoise-class submarine, commissioned in 1936 and stricken in 1942.

United States Navy ship names